Eveready Everready, or Ever Ready may refer to:

 Eveready Battery Company, a U.S. battery manufacturer which became Energizer Holdings
 Eveready Industries India, an Indian battery manufacturer in Kolkata that once was owned by the US company
 Eveready East Africa, is a Kenyan manufacturer and marketer of battery brands and an affiliate of the American Eveready Company
 British Ever Ready Electrical Company, a British battery manufacturer that later became a subsidiary of Energizer Holdings
 Eveready Inc., a now defunct Canadian oil and industrial services company
Everready (The Religion), an album by Tech N9ne
 Ever-Ready, a brand of the  American Safety Razor Company

See also
Eveready Harton in Buried Treasure, a 1929 pornographic animated cartoon